Pisco is a district in middle Pisco Province in Peru. It is bordered by the Pacific Ocean on the west, the district of San Clemente on the north, the Túpac Amaru Inca District on the east, and  the San Andrés District  on the south.

External links
  Municipalidad Provincial de Pisco

1900 establishments in Peru